The shoal chub (Macrhybopsis hyostoma) is a freshwater ray-finned fish in the family Cyprinidae, the carps and minnows. It occurs in Mississippi River drainages from eastern Ohio to southern Minnesota and Nebraska south to Louisiana. Its preferred habitat is sand and gravel runs of small to large rivers.

References

Macrhybopsis
Freshwater fish of the United States
Fish described in 1884